The 2014 ESPY Awards were announced from the Nokia Theatre on July 16, 2014, and were live on ESPN.

The event was hosted by Drake. ESPY Award is short for Excellence in Sports Performance Yearly Award.

Winners and nominees
Winners are listed first and highlighted in boldface.

Other winners:
Best Male U.S. Olympic Athlete: Sage Kotsenburg, Snowboard Slopestyle
Best Female College Athlete: Breanna Stewart, Connecticut Basketball
Best Male College Athlete: Doug McDermott, Creighton Basketball
Best NBA Player: Kevin Durant,  Oklahoma City Thunder
Best WNBA Player: Maya Moore, Minnesota Lynx
Best Male Tennis Player: Rafael Nadal
Best Female Tennis Player: Maria Sharapova
Best Coach/Manager: Gregg Popovich
Best Fighter: Floyd Mayweather
Best Breakthrough Athlete: Richard Sherman, Seattle Seahawks
Best Moment: USA Vs. Ghana, 2014 FIFA World Cup
Best Game: Alabama vs. Auburn, Iron Bowl
Best Play: Chris Davis FG return, Auburn vs. Alabama
Best Female Athlete: Ronda Rousey
Best Male Athlete: Kevin Durant
Best Upset: Mercer over Duke, NCAA Men's Basketball Tournament
Best Driver: Ryan Hunter-Reay, IndyCar
Best Team: Seattle Seahawks
Best NFL Player: Peyton Manning
Best NHL Player: Sidney Crosby, Pittsburgh Penguins
Best MLS Player: Tim Cahill
Best Male Golfer: Bubba Watson
Best Female Golfer: Michelle Wie
Best Jockey: Victor Espinoza

Honorary awards
 Jimmy V Award: Stuart Scott
 Arthur Ashe Courage Award: Michael Sam
 Pat Tillman Award for Service: Joshua Sweeney

In Memoriam

Tony Gwynn
Bum Phillips
Tom Gola
Ken Norton
Walt Bellamy
L. C. Greenwood
Jim Fregosi
Earl Morrall
Chuck Noll
Don Meyer
Rubin Carter
Ralph Wilson
Bob Welch
Emile Griffith
Bud Adams
Tommy Morrison
Todd Christensen
Don Zimmer
Don James
Louis Zamperini
Art Donovan
Ralph Kiner
Jack Ramsay
Jack Brabham
Eusébio
Alfredo Di Stéfano

References

External links
Official Site

2014
ESPY
ESPY
ESPY
ESPY